Roger Bonet Badia commonly known as Ruxi (born 11 April 1995) is a Spanish footballer who plays as a defender for FC Tulsa in the USL Championship. Besides Spain, he has played in the United States, Iceland, and Finland.

References

External links
 

1995 births
Living people
1. deild karla players
AC Oulu players
Afturelding men's football players
Association football defenders
Expatriate footballers in Iceland
Expatriate footballers in Finland
Expatriate soccer players in the United States
Footballers from Catalonia
SD Formentera players
Gimnàstic de Tarragona footballers
FC Inter Turku players
Kotkan Työväen Palloilijat players
UE Olot players
CF Pobla de Mafumet footballers
Primera Federación players
Rápido de Bouzas players
Segunda División B players
Spanish expatriate footballers
Spanish expatriate sportspeople in Iceland
Spanish expatriate sportspeople in Finland
Spanish expatriate sportspeople in the United States
Spanish footballers
Tercera Federación players
FC Tulsa players
USL Championship players
Veikkausliiga players
Ykkönen players